Sysedit is a specialized text/ASCII editor for core Microsoft Windows configuration files (such as , , , , and ). Sysedit was bundled with and automatically installed by every version of Windows from Windows 3.0 up to Windows 98 SE. Support was discontinued with Windows Me. At the time of its initial release, Sysedit was commonly used to demonstrate multiple document interfaces (MDI). It opens all of the aforementioned configuration files at once in separate daughter windows whenever launched. It still uses the System font from older versions of Windows.

Other Microsoft operating systems that include Sysedit are Windows XP, Windows Vista (Service Pack 2), Windows Server 2008, and Windows 7 (32-bit only).

See also
MSConfig

References

Windows components
Windows text editors
Configuration management
Windows 98